Igoumenitsa is a coastal city in northwestern Greece. It is the capital of the regional unit of Thesprotia.

Igoumenitsa is the chief port of Thesprotia and Epirus, and one of the largest passenger ports of Greece, connecting northwestern Mainland Greece with the Ionian Islands and Italy. The city is built on easternmost end of the Gulf of Igoumenitsa in the Ionian Sea and primary aspects of the economy are maritime, transport, services, agriculture and tourism.

Igoumenitsa features many shops, schools, offices and cargo storages, a university department, a library, an archeological museum, several sport stadiums and tennis courses, a courthouse and a medical clinic. The Thesprotia Police Headquarters and the Municipal Sailing Club are located here. The city itself is built on the slopes of a forested mountain and expands perimetrically around the gulf.

The 2011 census recorded 25,814 inhabitants for the wider Municipality, of which 9,820 in the municipal unit of Igoumenitsa proper. Igoumenitsa is known for being surrounded by several forests and for its blue waters. The nearby Drepanos Beach is one of the longest sand beaches in the region, with a length of over 7 kilometers.

Names
Igoumenitsa is known by various names in different time periods. During the medieval era it was mentioned in a golden bull by Simeon Uroš (1361). At a 15th century Greek portolan chart it was mentioned as Igoumenitza. Later in Ottoman times, it was known as Grava. or Reşadiye. In 1938, after it became the capital city of the prefecture of Thesprotia, its name was changed to the current Igoumenitsa. The name is a derivation from the Greek word Igoumeni which means "commander; abbot". The name has been adopted as Gomenizza in Italian and as Gumenicë in Albanian.

History

In ancient times, near Igoumenitsa, was the town of Gitanae (also known as Titana), and was one of the most important towns of the Kingdom of Thesprotis during the 4th century BC,  covering 28 hectares. The circumference of its walls was 2,400 metres. The walls had four gates. Internal walls, in the shape of a sickle, divided the city in half. Its most noteworthy tower, located at the top of the hill, was round, and is thought to have been a religious sanctuary. Excavations have revealed a theatre which seats 2,500 and ruins of two temples.

Gitanae was a meeting place of the Epirote League (Livy 42.38.1). A spur near Philiates between the Kalamas River, the acropolis had a fine semicircular tower. A small theater, towers, and gateways which are still visible. The Kalamas may have been navigable to this point. The city was destroyed by the Romans in 167 BC and later on it was annexed into the Roman Empire. It was ruled by Ottoman Empire and was renamed as "Reşadiye" in 1909 honour of Mehmet V, Ottoman Sultan between 1909 and 1918. During Italo-Turkish War, Hamidiye torpedo boat was sunk by an Italian destroyer on December 30, 1912 in here.

After the liberation of the region from Ottoman rule during the Balkan wars in 1913, the city name was Grava, a name that stayed in use until 1938, when the town became head of the prefecture of Thesprotia and was then renamed to Igoumenitsa. The town was destroyed in 1944 during the Axis occupation of Greece and a new settlement grew up around the new ferry terminal in the 1950s and 1960s.

Igoumenitsa was burnt by the Italian Fascist army in November 1940. At September 30, 1943, a representative of the international Red Cross, having visited the city recorded that the Greek population was expelled from Igoumenitsa and its population had to find refuge to the mountains. Following World War II, the Muslim Cham Albanian residents of Igoumenitsa were expelled after large parts of them collaborated with the invading German forces. The Cham-dialect of the Albanian language is still spoken by a minority of inhabitants in the town and the surrounding area.

Municipality

The present municipality Igoumenitsa was formed at the 2011 local government reform by the merger of the following 5 former municipalities, that became municipal units (constituent communities in brackets):
Igoumenitsa (Agia Marina, Agios Vlasios, Graikochori, Igoumenitsa, Kastri, Kryovrysi, Ladochori, Mavroudi, Nea Selefkeia)
Margariti (Eleftheri, Karteri, Katavothra, Margariti, Mazarakia, Mesovouni, Spatharaioi)
Parapotamos (Drimitsa, Geroplatanos, Koritiani, Parapotamos)
Perdika
Syvota (Argyrotopos, Faskomilia, Plataria, Syvota)

The municipality has an area of 428.353 km2, the municipal unit 111.752 km2.

Transport

The Patras, Greece to Brindisi, Italy car–ferry ships of the Hellenic Mediterranean Lines (HML) stop at Igoumenitsa, before crossing the Adriatic Sea and vice versa, as well as the ships of Superfast Ferries, ANEK Lines and several other shipping companies, before going to Ancona, Bari or Venice in Italy, and vice versa. Frequent passenger and car ferries to and from Corfu.

Between Thessaloniki and the Turkish border, the road runs more or less parallel to the ancient Roman Via Egnatia.

Ports

Igoumenitsa features two ports. The Old Port and the New Port, which is the second busiest passenger port of Greece, after Piraeus, even surpassing the Ports of Iraklion and Patras which are now the third and fourth largest in the country.

The sea-lines going to and coming from Igoumenitsa are:

According to the draft strategy prepared by the relevant Ministry of Shipping (2012-2013) the port of Igoumenitsa becomes a "Connection Portal" not only of Greece with the rest of Europe, but of the whole of Europe with the Balkans, the Black Sea and the Middle East, through the development of combined transport (maritime-roads) directly and long-term (through the Egnatia railway), incorporating the railroad.

In the beginning of 2012, the First Phase of the construction project of the New Port had been completed and progression to the Second Phase has begun in late 2013 and was completed by 2016, when the Third Phase of the construction began. With the completion of the First phase, Igoumenitsa has become a modern, large port in the Mediterranean Sea, able to serve passenger, commercial and tourist traffic. The completion of the Second Phase, enabled the port to serve large cruise ships. Also, the planned creation of a freight centre in a section within the port area is estimated to greatly strengthen the commercial traffic and turn the city of Igoumenitsa into an international logistics centre.

Port traffic statistics as of 2012:

Igoumenitsa serves the 61.73% of the maritime traffic, the 67.49% of car traffic and the 55.08% of truck traffic annually.

Population
The population of Igoumenitsa population is 9,145 residents and the urban area (agglomeration) is 17,902. The population of Municipality of Igoumenitsa is 25,814 permanent citizens. Igoumenitsa's population grew rapidly in recent years, as result of the increased traffic in the region because of the New Port. The chart below shows the development of the population of Igoumenitsa and the broader urban area according to the data of the Greek Statistical Agency:

Climate

The temperature table are dated .

The water is safe for swimming between the months of May to November, that's only half a year. In 2005, the town had 65 rainy days, the summer had 4 rainy days with 10 hours of mix of sun and clouds each day.

Tourism
Igoumenitsa is known for its green forests and blue crystal waters, and attracts many local tourists from the nearby regions, and especially from Italy. The city provides the possibility for walks, jogging on the beach or mountain, hiking, sports, boating or contact with nature. Also provides access to the Blue Flag beaches of Drepanos and Makrygiali with crystal clear waters and a length of 7 km, with both of them being situated on the northwestern edge of the Gulf of Igoumenitsa. The archaeological museum with exhibits from historical times until the Byzantines period. In recent years, the city has become a growing cruise destination, as cruise station for visits to archaeological sites and natural beauties of Thesprotia but also the entire Ionian coast.

Archaeological Museum

The archaeological museum of Igoumenitsa was opened in 2009 and is located on the north side, next to the Fire Department of the city. It consists of five main sections that showcase the history and culture of the region of Thesprotia from ancient times to the Byzantine period:
Archaeological-Historical background, Settlements of historical times, Public life, Private life, Burial customs.

International relations

Twin cities
Igoumenitsa is twinned with:
 Sarandë, Albania
 Velbert, Germany

Consulates/diplomatic missions
Igoumenitsa hosts consulates from the following countries:
 Germany

Gallery

See also
List of settlements in Thesprotia

References

External links
Official website 

Populated places in Thesprotia
Greek prefectural capitals
Municipalities of Epirus (region)
Mediterranean port cities and towns in Greece
Former Cham settlements
Albanian communities in Greece